3 was the number assigned to two distinct streetcar lines operated by the Los Angeles Railway in Los Angeles, California. Combined, they operated from 1924 to 1947.

1924 alignment

The first version of 3 was introduced in 1924, and was coterminous with the original A line. From a terminus at Adams Boulevard and Alsace Avenue, it ran via Adams Boulevard, Normandie Avenue, 24th Street, Hoover Street, Burlington Avenue, Venice Boulevard, Hill Street, First Street, Broadway, and Lincoln Park Avenue to Eastlake Park. This route was discontinued in 1930.

1931 alignment

Following much of the original route of the R Line, the new route 3 was drastically different. It is notable for its close parallels to Wilshire Boulevard, which never had a transit line of its own because auto traffic was too heavy. The new 3 ran from the intersection of Larchmont Boulevard and Melrose Avenue to Central Station, by way of Larchmont Boulevard (forming the backbone of the Larchmont neighborhood), 3rd Street, a private right of way running between Gramercy Place and Wilton Place, 6th Street, and 5th Street. From the start of this routing until 1935, short turns were made from 5th to 3rd and were designated as the 4 Line (distinct from that number's 1939 incarnation). The route was converted to trolley bus operation in 1947, eight years after Central Station closed.

Trolley coach and bus conversion
The service was maintained and transferred to Los Angeles Metropolitan Transit Authority in 1958. The agency replaced trolley buses with SilverLiner coaches after March 31, 1963; the new service retained the number 3.

Sources

External links
 3 Line Archives — Pacific Electric Railway Historical Society
 

Los Angeles Railway routes
Railway lines opened in 1924
Railway lines closed in 1947
1924 establishments in California
1947 disestablishments in California